Dr Yehuda Lancry (born 25 September 1947) is a Moroccan-born former Israeli politician and ambassador to France and the United Nations.

Born in Boujad in Morocco, Lancry studied at an alliance high school in Casablanca. He made aliyah to Israel in 1965 and gained a PhD in French literature from the University of Haifa and University of Nice Sophia Antipolis. Between 1983 and 1992 he served as head of the local council of Shlomi, and from 1991 until 1992 was chairman of Second Israeli Broadcasting Authority. He was appointed Israel's ambassador to France in 1992, serving until 1995. In 1996, Lancry was elected to the Knesset on the Likud-Gesher list and served as a Deputy Speaker of the Knesset and chairman of the Ethics committee. 

He lost his seat in the 1999 elections, but was appointed ambassador to the United Nations that year, serving until 2002. That same year, on 10 April 2002, Lancry's niece, Noa Shlomo, was killed in the suicide bombing of Egged bus #960 en route from Haifa to Jerusalem.

References

External links
 

1947 births
Living people
20th-century Moroccan Jews
Moroccan emigrants to Israel
University of Haifa alumni
Ambassadors of Israel to France
Permanent Representatives of Israel to the United Nations
Likud politicians
People from Boujad
Members of the 14th Knesset (1996–1999)
Deputy Speakers of the Knesset
Gesher (political party) politicians